Laurie Lynd (born May 19, 1959, in Toronto, Ontario) is a Canadian film and television director and screenwriter, best known as the director of the feature film Breakfast with Scot.

In his early career, Lynd made the short films Together and Apart (1986) and RSVP (1991), the latter of which was cited by film critic B. Ruby Rich in her influential 1992 essay on the emergence of New Queer Cinema. He then attended the Canadian Film Centre, making the short film The Fairy Who Didn't Want to Be a Fairy Anymore (1992) and the feature film House (1995) while studying at that institution; he was also credited as the producer of John Greyson's CFC project The Making of Monsters.

After his graduation from the CFC, he concentrated primarily on television directing, including the television films Sibs, Open Heart, episodes of Degrassi, Queer as Folk, I Was a Rat, Noah's Arc and Ghostly Encounters.

Breakfast with Scot, his second feature film, was released in 2007. His subsequent television work has included Forensic Factor, Baxter, Murdoch Mysteries, Good Witch, Schitt's Creek and The Adventures of Napkin Man.

In 2010 he released the short film Verona, which recast Romeo and Juliet as a romance between two gay university athletes from rival fraternities.

In 2019 he released the documentary film Killing Patient Zero.

References

External links 
 
 

1959 births
Canadian television directors
Directors of Genie and Canadian Screen Award winners for Best Live Action Short Drama
LGBT film directors
LGBT television directors
Living people
Canadian Film Centre alumni
Film directors from Toronto
Canadian LGBT screenwriters
Canadian male screenwriters
Writers from Toronto
Canadian gay writers
20th-century Canadian screenwriters
20th-century Canadian male writers
21st-century Canadian screenwriters
21st-century Canadian male writers
Gay screenwriters
21st-century Canadian LGBT people
20th-century Canadian LGBT people